Teius suquiensis is a species of lizard endemic to Argentina. It was named after the Rio Primero, which was also called the Rio Suquia.

References 

Teius
Reptiles of Argentina
Endemic fauna of Argentina
Reptiles described in 1991
Taxa named by Luciano Javier Ávila
Taxa named by Ricardo Amando Martori